Bryan Lavender House, also known as the Roscoe Barrus House, is a historic home located at Pollocksville, Jones County, North Carolina. It was built about 1825, and is a two-story, three bay, hall and parlor plan Federal style frame dwelling.  It rests on a brick pier foundation and has a gable roof. The front facade features a two-tier engaged porch with an enclosed end exterior stair.

It was listed on the National Register of Historic Places in 1985.

References

Houses on the National Register of Historic Places in North Carolina
Federal architecture in North Carolina
Houses completed in 1825
Houses in Jones County, North Carolina
National Register of Historic Places in Jones County, North Carolina